A greeting is an act of communication in which human beings intentionally make their presence known to each other.

Greeting  may also refer to:

Films
 Greetings (1968 film), 1968 film by Brian De Palma

Music
 Greeting (album), 2004 album by Nami Tamaki
 The Greeting, 1978 album a McCoy Tyner film
 "Greetings", a song by P.O.D. from The Fundamental Elements of Southtown
 "Greetings", a song by Devin Townsend's from Ocean Machine: Biomech

Other uses
 Thomas Greeting, English musician